Santeri Hostikka (born 30 September 1997) is a Finnish professional footballer who plays for Veikkausliiga club HJK as a forward.

Club career

Hostikka has played for PKKU and Lahti.

In December 2018, Hostikka signed with Polish club Pogoń Szczecin with effect from January 2019.

In August 2021 he returned to Finland with HJK.

International career
He played for Finland under-21.

He was first called up to the Finland national football team in January 2018 for a friendly against Jordan, but did not play then. He made his debut on 1 September 2021 in a friendly against Wales. He started the game and was substituted after 64 minutes of play in a 0–0 draw at home.

References

External links

1997 births
Living people
Finnish footballers
Pallokerho Keski-Uusimaa players
FC Lahti players
Pogoń Szczecin players
Helsingin Jalkapalloklubi players
Kakkonen players
Veikkausliiga players
Ekstraklasa players
Expatriate footballers in Poland
Association football defenders
Finnish expatriate sportspeople in Poland
Finnish expatriate footballers
Finland under-21 international footballers
Finland international footballers